Grundbach may refer to:

 Grundbach (Elbbach), a river of Hesse, Germany
 Grundbach (Jagst), a river of Baden-Württemberg, Germany
 Grundwasser, also called Grundbach, a river of Saxony, Germany